Mercy Peak was a New Zealand television series that ran for three seasons on local network TV One, between 2001 and 2004. The series rated well in New Zealand (especially in its second series) and won multiple awards for its cast. Though an ensemble show, Mercy Peak centres on a doctor (played by Sara Wiseman) who leaves the city to work at a hospital in the small town of Bassett. She works alongside stuffy but caring doctor William Kingsley (Jeffrey Thomas from Shark in the Park). The series was produced by Auckland company South Pacific Pictures; a number of those who worked on the show would have a big hand in South Pacific Pictures hit Outrageous Fortune, including co-creator Rachel Lang, directors Mark Beesley and Simon Bennett, and producer John Laing.

Cast
Sara Wiseman as Nicky Somerville
Jeffrey Thomas as William Kingsley
Craig Parker as Alistair Kingsley
Alison Bruce as Louise Duval
Tim Balme as Ken Wilder
Tamati Te Nohotu as Cliff Tairoa
Renato Bartolomei as Kieran Masefield
Miriama Smith as Dana McNichol
Dwayne Cameron as Gus Van der Velter
Angela Vint as Helen Blakemore

Episodes

Series 1 (2001–02)

Series 2 (2002–03)

Series 3 (2003–04)

Reception
The show won three awards at the 2002 New Zealand Television Awards: Best Supporting Actor (Tim Balme), Best Supporting Actress (Alison Bruce), and Best Script. It won a further two awards at the following year's ceremony: Best Actor (Jeffrey Thomas) and Best Supporting Actress (Alison Bruce).

References

External links

 on South Pacific Pictures
 on NZ on Screen

2000s New Zealand television series
2001 New Zealand television series debuts
2004 New Zealand television series endings
New Zealand drama television series
Television shows funded by NZ on Air
Television shows set in New Zealand
TVNZ 1 original programming
Television series by South Pacific Pictures